Montville is a commune in the Seine-Maritime department in the Normandy region in north-western France.

Geography
SNCF operates a TER train service here. Two small rivers meet here, the Clérette and the Cailly.

1845 tornado
On August 19, 1845, a violent F5 tornado hit Montville, killing 75 and injuring another 130. Mahy trees were debarked and uprooted. Many buildings were destroyed, including three well-built mills.

Heraldry

Population

Places of interest
 The church of Notre-Dame de l'Assomption, dating from the eleventh century.
 A 17th century chapel.
 The château, dating from the 19th century.
 The National Firefighters Museum.
 Several interesting old buildings dating from the seventeenth century.
 The mairie, housing a tricolor dating from 1789.

Twin towns
  Haiger (Hesse, Germany)
  Santa Eulàlia de Ronçana (Catalonia, Spain)

See also
Communes of the Seine-Maritime department

References

External links

Official website of Montville 
Museum of the Sapeurs Pompiers 

Communes of Seine-Maritime